Julien Mawule Kouto (June 19, 1946 – June 4, 2015) was a Roman Catholic bishop.

Ordained to the priesthood in 1975, Kouto was appointed bishop of the Roman Catholic Diocese of Atakpamé, Togo, in 1994 and resigned in 2006.

Notes

1946 births
2015 deaths
Togolese Roman Catholic bishops
Roman Catholic bishops of Atakpamé
21st-century Togolese people